Mavji Desai is a Member of Gujarat Legislative Assembly from Dhanera- Banaskantha, Chairman of APMC Deesa, Former Vice-Chairman of Banas Dairy, and the member of Bhartiya Janta Party.

Early life

He was born on 3 October 1971 in Baiwada, Gujarat in a farmer family of Maganbhai Desai and Rukhiben Desai.

Political career 

He contested his first ever election of the Sarpanch in 2001 from Baiwada. Then he was elected as Director of APMC Deesa from three terms. At present, He is Chairman of Agriculture Producing Marketing Committee of Deesa, Vice chairman of Banaskantha District Cooperative Milk Federation, Palanpur (Banas Dairy).

On 24 November 2017 The BJP Central Election Committee nominated Mavji Desai (Rabari) as MLA candidate from Dhanera, Banaskantha.

References

External links 

 
 
 

Living people
1972 births
Bharatiya Janata Party politicians from Gujarat
People from Banaskantha district
Gujarat MLAs 2022–2027